The city of St. Louis, Missouri, in the United States is home to a number of professional and collegiate sports teams. The Sporting News rated St. Louis the nation's "Best Sports City" in 2000 and the Wall Street Journal named it the best sports city in 2015.

St. Louis has three major league sports teams. The St. Louis Cardinals, one of the oldest franchises in Major League Baseball (MLB), have won 11 World Series, second only to the New York Yankees' 27. The St. Louis Blues of the National Hockey League (NHL) won the 2019 Stanley Cup, appeared in three championship finals from 1968 to 1970, and made 25 consecutive playoff appearances from 1979–80 to 2003–04. St. Louis City SC of Major League Soccer and the St. Louis Battlehawks of the XFL are set to play in 2023

The most recent team to begin play in St. Louis was the St. Louis BattleHawks of the XFL. The city is slated to get another major professional team with the arrival of St. Louis City SC, a Major League Soccer expansion team set to begin play in 2023. St. Louis has an extensive history in soccer, contributing at least one participant to each FIFA World Cup contested by the United States men's team. The city is the birthplace of corkball.

Current teams

Major league teams

Minor league and notable amateur teams

Baseball

See footnote

St. Louis is represented in Major League Baseball by the Cardinals, founded in 1882 and playing in the National League since 1892. The team won its first World Series in 1926 and its 11th and most recent in 2011. The team plays at the 43,795-seat Busch Stadium (the third ground to bear that name), which has a view of the city's Gateway Arch.

The 2009 Major League Baseball All-Star Game between the American League (AL) and the National League (NL) was held on July 14, 2009, at Busch Stadium. It was the first All-Star Game held in St. Louis since .

The St. Louis Browns played in the AL from 1902 to 1953.

The St. Louis Giants were a Negro league baseball team from 1906 to 1921. In 1922, the Giants were renamed the St. Louis Stars and went on to win championships in 1928, 1930, and the club's final season, 1931. National Baseball Hall of Fame inductees James “Cool Papa” Bell, Willie “The Devil” Wells, and George “Mule” Suttles wore the St. Louis Stars uniform.

Soccer

On August 20, 2019, Major League Soccer announced it had approved St. Louis as the league's 28th franchise. The franchise, St. Louis City SC, was initially expected to join in the 2022 season, but its debut was put off to 2023. It will play home games at CityPark, nearing completion next to Union Station.

City SC's reserve side, St. Louis City SC 2 (aka City2), began play in 2022 as one of the 21 inaugural members of MLS Next Pro, a third-level league consisting almost entirely of.reserve sides of MLS clubs. City2 splits its home schedule between Hermann Stadium at Saint Louis University and Ralph Korte Stadium at Southern Illinois University Edwardsville.

St. Louis is represented in the IPL by the St. Louis Ambush and in the USL by Saint Louis FC., who played their games at World Wide Technology Soccer Park in Fenton.

St. Louis has long had a reputation as being one of America's soccer hotbeds, and is home to arguably the richest soccer history in the nation. The city has a strong tradition of prep and select soccer, which is followed very closely by many area residents. St. Louis has contributed at least one participant to each FIFA World Cup contested by the United States men's team. The Saint Louis University men's soccer team has won 10 national championships, appeared in 16 NCAA Final Fours, and consistently ranks among the top-10 Division I soccer teams by attendance.

In 2013, Chelsea and Manchester City played to a sellout crowd of 48,000 at Busch Stadium. Later that year, on August 10, the Edward Jones Dome hosted a friendly between Real Madrid and Internazionale before 54,184 fans, who set a St. Louis record for attendance for a soccer match.

Every U.S. team in men's World Cup history has included at least one St. Louisan on its roster, and 29 St. Louisans have been inducted into the National Soccer Hall of Fame. 
Five St. Louisans, including many from the historically Italian neighborhood of The Hill, played on the U.S. team for the 1950 World Cup, which defeated England 1-0 in one of the most noted upsets in World Cup history. This event was chronicled in the 2005 film The Game of Their Lives (released on DVD as The Miracle Match). Several recent American soccer players are from St. Louis, including Brad Davis, Chris Klein, Pat Noonan, Matt Pickens, Steve Ralston, Mike Sorber, Tim Ream, and Taylor Twellman. Additionally, current Bosnia and Herzegovina player Vedad Ibišević attended high school in the city and played a season for SLU.

St. Louis is the former home of several professional teams, including the St. Louis Stars, which played in St. Louis from 1967 to 1977 in the North American Soccer League. St. Louis also was the home of the St. Louis Steamers, an indoor soccer team that played in St. Louis from 1979 to 1988. The Steamers averaged over 17,000 fans during their peak, outdrawing the St. Louis Blues NHL team. The St. Louis Ambush stole the scene from 1992 to 2000. Featuring mainly local talent, the team won the 1995 NPSL championship, which was and still is the only professional soccer championship in the history of St. Louis.

The Saint Louis Athletica competed in Women's Professional Soccer from 2009 to 2010. Athletica played its home matches on the campus of Southern Illinois University Edwardsville and later moved to Scott Gallagher Soccer Park in west county. The team folded in May 2010 when donors did not continue to fund the team.

Club Atletico Saint Louis, a semi-professional soccer team, began play in 2018 after being founded as a youth clinic two years prior. The team competes within the National Premier Soccer League and plays out of St. Louis University High School Soccer Stadium.

The St. Louis Soccer Hall of Fame, established in 1971, is located at the Midwest Soccer Academy and includes a museum with various exhibits. The first annual dinner was held in 1971.

Ice hockey

The St. Louis Blues are a professional ice hockey team in St. Louis. They are members of the Central Division of the Western Conference of the NHL. The team is named after the famous W. C. Handy song "Saint Louis Blues", and plays in the 19,150-seat Enterprise Center in downtown St. Louis. The franchise was founded in 1967 as one of the expansion teams during the league's original expansion from six to twelve teams.  The team won the Stanley Cup in 2019.

The first NHL team to call St. Louis its home was the St. Louis Eagles.  The franchise moved from Ottawa in time for the 1934–35 NHL season. The Ottawa Senators had played in the NHL from 1917 to 1934. During that time the team had won the Stanley Cup in 1903, 1904, 1905, 1906, 1909, 1910, 1911, 1920, 1921, 1923, and 1927. Following the Cup win in 1927 the team went on a sharp decline and in December 1933 rumors surfaced that the Senators would merge with the equally strapped New York Americans. This information was denied by Ottawa club president Frank Ahearn, who had sought financial help from the league. The team played the full 1933–34 season, transferring one home game to Detroit. Near the end of the season, reports surfaced that the club had entered into a deal with St. Louis "interests" to move the club. The team lost its last home game by a score of 3–2 to the Americans on March 15, 1934, before a crowd of 6,500. The final game of the season was a 2–2 tie with the Maroons at the Montreal Forum on March 18, 1934.

The Eagles would survive only one season, as the team continued to lose money due to high travel costs. At that time, the league only had nine teams, with St. Louis playing in the Canadian Division. The division consisted of two teams in Montreal (the Canadiens and Maroons), one team in Toronto (Toronto) and the New York Americans. The American Division hosted the Boston Bruins, Detroit Red Wings, Chicago Black Hawks and the New York Rangers. The Eagles would finish with a league-worse record of 11-31-6.

American football

St. Louis has been the home of four National Football League (NFL) franchises. Three years after the NFL was founded in 1920, it accepted the St. Louis All-Stars as a franchise for the 1923 NFL season. The team finished 1–4–2 in league play, and a 2–5–2 overall record while finishing fourteenth in the standings. The team's first NFL game was on October 7, 1923, and it ended in a 0–0 tie as they played on the road against the Green Bay Packers. A week later they played to another 0–0 tie in their first home game, against the Hammond Pros, a traveling team from Hammond, Indiana. St. Louis played at Sportsman's Park, a facility that also hosted both of the professional baseball teams in the city: the Cardinals and the Browns. Their sole victory came on November 11, 1923, when they defeated the Oorang Indians (from LaRue, Ohio), 14–7.

The second franchise was the St. Louis Gunners.  The Gunners were an independent professional football team that played the last three games of the 1934 National Football League season, replacing the Cincinnati Reds on the league schedule after the Reds' league membership was suspended. They won their first game against the Pittsburgh Pirates (now Steelers) 6–0, but lost the last two to the Detroit Lions (40–7) and the Green Bay Packers (21–14).  Six of the Reds players joined the team for the last two games. The team was headquartered at the St. Louis National Guard Armory, which accounts for its nickname the 'Gunners'.

The third franchise was the St. Louis Cardinals and they played in St. Louis from 1960 to 1987. They advanced to the playoffs just three times (1974, 1975 & 1982), never hosting or winning in any appearance. In 1987, the team moved to Phoenix, Arizona and became the Phoenix Cardinals; the team changed its geographic location name to Arizona in 1994. Before moving to St. Louis, the Cardinals were based in Chicago. The Chicago Cardinals played there from their founding in 1898 until their move to Missouri in 1959.

The fourth franchise was the St. Louis Rams who played in the city from 1995 to 2015. Founded in 1936 in Cleveland, Ohio, the Rams won the pre-merger NFL Championship twice, in 1945 and 1951. After playing in Los Angeles from 1946 to 1994, the Rams moved to St. Louis in 1995. The team appeared in 2 Super Bowls while based in St. Louis, defeating the Tennessee Titans 23–16 to win Super Bowl XXXIV in 2000, and losing 20–17 to the New England Patriots in Super Bowl XXXVI in 2002. The team's home in St. Louis, the Edward Jones Dome, hosted 66,965 spectators.

On January 13, 2016, it was announced that NFL owners voted 30–2 to allow Rams ownership to move the team back to Los Angeles for the 2016 season.

In December 2018, it was announced the XFL would place a team in St. Louis. The St. Louis BattleHawks began play in February 2020 and played their home games at the Dome. The XFL season was ended prematurely by the COVID-19 pandemic, and the league soon folded and filed for bankruptcy. The BattleHawks are slated to return in February 2023.

Saint Louis University football coach Eddie Cochems developed the first modern passing offense in American football history in 1906.  Cochems' star halfback, Bradbury Robinson, threw the first legal forward pass on September 5, 1906, in a 22–0 victory over Carroll College at Waukesha, Wisconsin.

Basketball
St. Louis was home to two National Basketball Association (NBA) teams, the St. Louis Bombers (1949–50) and the St. Louis Hawks (1955–1968), who won the NBA Title in 1958, and also to the American Basketball Association (ABA)'s Spirits of St. Louis (1974–76), before the ABA–NBA merger. Since 2011, St. Louis has supported the St. Louis Surge, a women's professional basketball team owned by Khalia Collier, which played in the Women's Blue-Chip Basketball League (WBCBL) through 2018 before moving to the Global Women's Basketball Association (GWBA) for the 2019 season. The Surge has won two national championships and five regional.

Corkball
St. Louis has several recreational corkball leagues. A variant of baseball, corkball is played with a 1.6-oz. ball and a bat whose barrel is 1.5" wide. It has many of the features of baseball, yet can be played in a very small area because there is no base-running. Invented on the streets and alleys of St. Louis in the early 1900s, the game has leagues around the country, thanks to servicemen who introduced the game to their buddies during World War II and the Korean War.

Individual sports
St. Louis was home to four prominent twentieth-century boxers: Sonny Liston, Henry Armstrong, and brothers Leon and Michael Spinks. The Spinkses are the first of only two sets of brothers to have captured the heavyweight boxing title. Leon's son Cory Spinks has also held a world title.

The Gateway Cross Cup is an international professional competition in cyclo-cross, a combination of mountain bike racing and road bicycle racing.

College sports

Saint Louis University (SLU) plays NCAA Division I sports as a member of the Atlantic 10 Conference. SLU dropped football as an intercollegiate sport in 1949, but SLU is best known for its men's basketball and men's soccer programs. SLU men's soccer led the NCAA in average attendance in 1999, 2001, and 2003, drawing over 2,700 fans per match each season. In 2006, the College Cup was played at Hermann Stadium on the SLU campus.

The Metro East region, across the Mississippi River in Illinois, is home to Southern Illinois University Edwardsville (SIUE), whose teams play as the SIU Edwardsville Cougars in the Division I Ohio Valley Conference. Like SLU, SIUE does not sponsor football, but unlike SLU has never had a football program. SIUE is also known for its men's soccer program, and has an active rivalry with the Billikens. The men's soccer team is a member of the Missouri Valley Conference, since the OVC sponsors soccer only for women.

Lindenwood University, located in the suburb of St. Charles, is represented by the Lindenwood Lions. With the start of the school's transition from Division II to Division I in July 2022, most Lions teams compete in the Ohio Valley Conference. Even before the Lions' move to Division I, three Lindenwood programs competed as effective Division I members in sports that have no Division II national championship. The women's ice hockey team competes in College Hockey America, the women's gymnastics team competes in the Midwest Independent Conference, and the men's volleyball team plays in the Midwestern Intercollegiate Volleyball Association. All three teams remain in their respective leagues, since the OVC sponsors none of these sports. Five other Lindenwood teams that had competed in the school's former D-II home of the Great Lakes Valley Conference joined other D-I conferences in 2022, all in sports not sponsored by the OVC. Men's and women's lacrosse joined the ASUN Conference, while men's soccer and men's and women's swimming & diving joined the Summit League. Men's ice hockey, which was added as a varsity sport in 2022–23, competes as a Division I independent. Lindenwood's rugby program, despite having started only in 2011, is one of the top ranked rugby programs in the country.

Lindenwood also operated a sister campus on the Illinois side of the river in Belleville from 2009 until that campus was closed in 2020. The Belleville campus had been a dual member of the NAIA and USCAA in its first season of varsity athletics in 2011–12, and then fully aligned with the NAIA, remaining in that organization until the campus' closure.

The University of Missouri–St. Louis, located just outside the city limits in St. Louis County, also has an NCAA Division II athletic program in the UMSL Tritons. All of the school's teams compete in the Great Lakes Valley Conference.

In NCAA Division III, the Washington University Bears, representing Washington University in St. Louis, have won 18 national titles in four different sports.

In March 2005, The Dome at America's Center, then known as Edward Jones Dome, in St. Louis hosted the final two rounds of the NCAA Men's Division I Basketball Championship, also known as the Final Four. In April 2009, the Edward Jones Dome hosted the NCAA Women's Division I Basketball Championship Final Four. The Enterprise Center also hosts the annual "Braggin' Rights" game, a men's college basketball rivalry game between the universities of Illinois and Missouri. St. Louis is roughly equidistant from the two campuses.

The Enterprise Center, then known as Scottrade Center, hosted the 2007 Frozen Four college ice hockey tournament on April 5 and April 7, 2007.

Since 2000, the Enterprise Center has hosted the NCAA Division I Wrestling Championships nine times, most recently in 2021.

Former teams

References